Brycus or Brykous was a town of ancient Greece on the island of Karpathos. 
It was a member of the Delian League.

Its site is located near modern Ag. Marina, Avlona.

References

Populated places in the ancient Aegean islands
Former populated places in Greece
Members of the Delian League
Dorian colonies
Ancient ports in Greece